Ian J. Lygo (born September 1958) is a British civil servant from Hemel Hempstead, who made 75 appearances on the UK game show 100% in late 1998, with the 75th appearance occurring on 14 December of that year. On 30 November 2004 this record was tied by Ken Jennings on Jeopardy!.  However, because Jennings lost on his 75th appearance, Lygo became the sole holder of the record for most consecutive wins on a game show. This record has since been broken, with a team from the Spanish version of the game show Boom! holding the current record at 505, although he still holds the record for English-language game shows. Since he won £100 for each game, his total winnings were £7,500.

After his 73rd win, Grundy Productions, the producers of 100%, informed Lygo that they had changed the rules. From now on they were limiting the number of wins to only twenty-five, after receiving letters from viewers saying they were fed up of him winning day after day, week after week (by that time, he was in his fifteenth week on the programme). "I was given no warning," Lygo told The Daily Mirror. "The producer came up and said, 'We are changing the format.' He said there was a new limit. I had no choice in the matter. I was told I could do two more shows and that was that. I wanted it to be made plain on the show that I was being stopped, but that didn't happen. The announcer (Robin Houston) just said, 'Well done' and 'goodbye.'" According to UKGameShows.com, he believed that retiring after 100 episodes would have been more fitting with the show's theme. Lygo was, however, given a bottle of champagne by Grundy for his achievement.

After Lygo's run, the producers later decided to restrict the number of consecutive wins to 25.

Lygo has a degree in history from the University of Kent. He was chosen for the show after an audition at a hotel in Devon. He works for the Highways Agency.

References

Additional sources
IMDB News, 17 December 1998.

Alumni of the University of Kent
British civil servants
Contestants on British game shows
Living people
1958 births
People from Hemel Hempstead